Chrysochus is a genus of leaf beetles in the subfamily Eumolpinae. It is known from North America, Europe and Asia.

Etymology
The name of the genus is derived from the Greek  (chrysochóos), meaning "goldsmith".

Taxonomic history
In 1836, the genus Chrysochus was first established by Louis Alexandre Auguste Chevrolat in Dejean's Catalogue des Coléoptères, including the species Chrysomela asiatica Pallas, 1771, C. aurata Fabricius, 1775 and C. pretiosa  Fabricius, 1792 (now Chrysochares asiaticus, Chrysochus auratus and Chrysochus asclepiadeus, respectively). Chrysomela praetiosa was  designated as the type species of the genus by Sylvain Auguste de Marseul in 1864. 

The generic name Chrysochus Chevrolat in Dejean, 1836 is a conserved name. It was threatened by Eumolpus in the sense used by Kugelann in Illiger, 1798, which included Chrysomela praetiosa. An application to conserve Chrysochus and other names by suppressing Eumolpus Illiger, 1798 was accepted by the International Commission on Zoological Nomenclature in 2012.

Species
There are at least eight described species in Chrysochus. Six are found in the Palearctic realm, and only two are found in North America.
 Chrysochus asclepiadeus (Pallas, 1773) – widespread across Europe, also found in Kazakhstan and Turkey
 Chrysochus asclepiadeus asiaeminoris De Monte, 1948 (Considered a synonym by Ekiz et al. (2015))
 Chrysochus auratus (Fabricius, 1775) – Dogbane beetle; found in eastern North America
 Chrysochus brevefasciatus Pic, 1934 – found in Shanghai, China
 Chrysochus chinensis Baly, 1859 – found in Central, North and Northeast China, Japan, Mongolia and the Russian Far East
 Chrysochus cobaltinus LeConte, 1857 – Blue milkweed beetle; found in the western United States and British Columbia
 Chrysochus globicollis Lefèvre, 1888 – found in Northeast China, the Russian Far East and North Korea
 Chrysochus goniostoma Weise, 1889 – found in North and Northeast China, Mongolia, and the Russian Far East
 Chrysochus sikhima Jacoby, 1908 – found in Sikkim, India

While he did not know where the specimens were collected from, Lefèvre thought that they probably came from North America.

The following species, all from the Oriental realm, were formerly included in Chrysochus. They were transferred to the genera Parheminodes and Platycorynus in 2021:
 Chrysochus conspectus Lefèvre, 1890: moved to Parheminodes
 Chrysochus hageni Jacoby, 1884: moved to Parheminodes
 Chrysochus languei Lefèvre, 1893: moved to Platycorynus
 Chrysochus massiei Lefèvre, 1893: moved to Parheminodes
 Chrysochus mouhoti Baly, 1864: moved to Parheminodes
 Chrysochus nilgiriensis Jacoby, 1908: moved to Parheminodes
 Chrysochus pulcher Baly, 1864: moved to Parheminodes

Biology
All species of Chryochus feed on plants in the Apocynaceae (dogbane) and Asclepiadaceae (milkweed) families. A small mutation has allowed the two North American species, C. auratus and C. cobaltinus, in particular to feed on the plant species containing cardenolides, while all other species of the genus feed on plant species without cardenolides.

References

Further reading

Eumolpinae
Chrysomelidae genera
Beetles of the United States
Beetles of Europe
Beetles of Asia
Taxa named by Louis Alexandre Auguste Chevrolat